HMS Cynthia was a two funnel, 30-knot destroyer ordered by the Royal Navy under the 1896 – 1897 Naval Estimates.  She was the third ship to carry this name. She was launched in 1898, served in home waters and the Mediterranean before World War I, and as a tender to the gunnery school at Sheerness during the war. She was sold for breaking in 1920.

Construction
She was laid down as yard number 321 on 16 July 1896 at the John I. Thornycroft & Company shipyard at Chiswick on the River Thames.  She was launched on 8 January 1898.  During her builder's trials her maximum average speed was 30.2 knots, then proceeded to Portsmouth to have her armament fitted.  She was completed and accepted by the Royal Navy in June 1899.  During her acceptance trials and work ups her average sea speed was 25 knots.

Service
Cynthia was commissioned at Chatham on 8 March 1900 by Commander Murray MacGregor Lockhart, for service in the Medway Instructional Flotilla. Lieutenant Ernest Sausmarez Carey took the command on 27 December 1900, but was succeeded by Lieutenant James William Guy Innes three months later. In August 1901 she was commissioned to serve with the Mediterranean Fleet, and in May 1902 she completed a refit at Sheerness Dockyard. Lieutenant Rowland Henry Bather was appointed in command, but was reassigned before taking up the position and Lieutenant Alan Cameron Bruce was lent in command of the ship for passage ″out″, when she travelled to Gibraltar in late May 1902. In September 1902 she visited Nauplia with other ships of the fleet.

On 30 August 1912 the Admiralty directed all destroyer classes were to be designated by letters. she was assigned to the D class along with other destroyers of 30-knots with two funnels.  After 30 September 1913, she was known as a D-class destroyer and had the letter ‘D’ painted on the hull below the bridge area and on either the fore or aft funnel.

By August 1914 she was in active commission at The Nore Local Flotilla based at Sheerness tendered to HMS Actaeon, the school of gunnery.)  She remained in this deployment for the duration of the First World War.

Decommissioning and disposal
In 1919 she was paid off and laid-up in reserve awaiting disposal.  Cynthia was sold on 29 April 1920 to Thos. W. Ward of Sheffield for breaking at Rainham, Kent, on the Thames Estuary.

Pennant numbers

References

Bibliography
 
 
 
 
 
 
 
 
 
 

 

Ships built in Chiswick
1898 ships
D-class destroyers (1913)
Ships built by John I. Thornycroft & Company